Mount Harrison is a large mountain,  high, which dominates the ridge separating Robilliard Glacier and Svendsen Glacier, in the Usarp Mountains of Antarctica. It was named by the Advisory Committee on Antarctic Names for Louis J. Harrison, a US Army helicopter mechanic in the field in support of the United States Geological Survey surveys Topo North–South (1961–62) and Topo East–West (1962–63), the latter including the survey of this mountain.

References

Mountains of Oates Land